Giorgio Turchi (born January 27, 1931 in Carpi) is a retired Italian professional football player.

Honours
 Serie A champion: 1957/58.

1931 births
Living people
Sportspeople from Carpi, Emilia-Romagna
Italian footballers
Serie A players
Bologna F.C. 1909 players
Juventus F.C. players
L.R. Vicenza players
Cagliari Calcio players
A.C. Cesena players
Association football midfielders
Footballers from Emilia-Romagna